Tseri, also known as Seri or Xeri, is a south suburb of Nicosia, Cyprus.

Overview
The region had a population of about of 300 people before 1974. In 2011, it had a population of 7,035. Its inhabitants are known as "Tseriotis" or "Tserkotis" for males and "Tseriotissa" or "Tserkotissa" for females. Following a referendum in 2011, Tseri became a municipality.

Notable residents
 Theodosis Pierides (1908–1968), poet

References

 http://www.fallingrain.com/world/CY/4/Xeri.html
 https://web.archive.org/web/20041016055705/http://www.tseri.org/english/istoria.shtm

Municipalities in Nicosia District